Richard Charles "Ric" Thorpe (born 3 February 1965) is a British Church of England bishop and an expert in church planting. Since September 2015, he has been the Bishop of Islington, a suffragan bishop in the Diocese of London, and the "bishop for church plants". From 2005 to 2015, he led St Paul's Church, Shadwell, first as priest-in-charge and from 2010 as rector. From 2012 to 2015, he was the Bishop of London's Adviser for Church Planting. From 2015, he leads Centre for Church Multiplication.

Early life
Thorpe was born on 3 February 1965. He was educated at Stowe School, a private school in Stowe, Buckinghamshire. He studied chemical engineering at the University of Birmingham and graduated with a Bachelor of Science (BSc) degree in 1987. His first career was as a marketing manager with Unilever.

From 1990 to 1992, Thorpe was a lay worship leader at Holy Trinity Brompton (HTB) in the Diocese of London. In 1993, he entered Wycliffe Hall, an Evangelical Anglican theological college, to study theology and train for ordained ministry.

Ordained ministry
Thorpe was ordained in the Church of England: made a deacon at Petertide 1996 (30 June) by Richard Chartres, Bishop of London at St Paul's Cathedral and ordained a priest the Petertide following (29 June 1997), by Michael Colclough, Bishop of Kensington at Holy Trinity Church, Hounslow. He began his ministry as a curate at Holy Trinity Brompton in the Diocese of London. After almost 10 years of ordained ministry, he was chosen to lead a church plant from HTB to St Paul's Church, Shadwell. This involved moving 100 parishioners and a number of clergy from HTB to St Paul's to revitalise the flagging church. He was appointed priest in charge of St Paul's with St James, Ratcliffe, in 2005 and made rector in 2010. From 2010 to 2014, he was also priest in charge of All Hallows, Bow.

In addition to St Paul's, Thorpe has been involved with a further four church plants. Since 2012, he has been the Bishop of London's Adviser for Church Planting. He is a tutor in church planting at St Mellitus College, an Anglican theological college, and leader of its church planting course.

Episcopal ministry
In May 2015, it was announced that the See of Islington would be brought out of abeyance to create a "bishop for church plants". The bishop is to be based in the Diocese of London but would be free from territorial responsibilities and would work with the whole Church of England. On 9 July 2015, it was announced that Thorpe would be the next suffragan bishop of Islington. On 29 September 2015, he was consecrated a bishop by Justin Welby, Archbishop of Canterbury, at St Paul's Cathedral.

Views
In 2023, following the news that the House of Bishop's of the Church of England was to introduce proposals for blessing same-sex relationships, he signed an open letter which stated:

Personal life
Thorpe is married to Louise Rachel "Louie" Arden-White. Together they have three children: Zoe, Barny and Toby.

References

|-

1965 births
Living people
Church of England priests
20th-century English Anglican priests
21st-century English Anglican priests
Evangelical Anglican bishops
Alumni of the University of Birmingham
Alumni of Wycliffe Hall, Oxford
People educated at Stowe School
Holy Trinity Brompton people
Staff of St Mellitus College